Kam Guran (also Romanized as Kam Gūrān; also known as Kamegoran, Kamegoron, Kameh Gorūn) is a village in Rudkhaneh Bar Rural District, Rudkhaneh District, Rudan County, Hormozgan Province, Iran. At the 2006 census, its population was 65, in 15 families.

References 

Populated places in Rudan County